Nádia Filipa Gomes Coelho (born 9 November 1996) is a Portuguese-American footballer who played as a forward for NWSL club Orlando Pride and the Portugal national team.

College career
Gomes played for Brigham Young University from 2014 to 2017. As a freshman, she made 21 appearances and finished the season with three goals and three assists. During her second year, she scored nine goals, including five game-winners, and recorded four assists. She was named WCC Player of the Year and selected to the NSCAA All-America third team. As a junior, she was named to the preseason watch list for the Hermann Trophy and finished the season with six goals and twelve assists. As a senior, she started in all 19 matches and was tied second on the team in goals with five and assists with four.

Club career

Orlando Pride (2018)
On 18 January 2018, Gomes was selected by Orlando Pride as the 23rd overall draft pick at the 2018 NWSL College Draft. She did not make the final roster selection for the 2018 season. On 30 March, she was signed by the Pride as a National Team Replacement Player, as Orlando had several players away on International duty.

International career
Gomes represented Portugal at the 2014 UEFA Women's Under-19 Championship, where she started five of her six appearances and scored two goals as a defender. In February 2018, she was named to Portugal's 2018 Algarve Cup squad. On 2 March 2018, she made her debut in 0–0 draw with Australia. On 7 March 2018, she scored her first goal in a 2–1 win over Australia as Portugal earned its first third-place finish in the tournament.

References

External links

Nádia Gomes at BYU Athletics
 

1996 births
Living people
People from Viseu
Portuguese women's footballers
BYU Cougars women's soccer players
Orlando Pride draft picks
Portugal women's international footballers
Portuguese people of Bissau-Guinean descent
Women's association football forwards
Sportspeople from Viseu District